An udder is an organ formed of two or four mammary glands on the females of dairy animals and ruminants such as cattle, goats, and sheep. An udder is equivalent to the breast in primates and elephantine pachyderms. The udder is a single mass hanging beneath the animal, consisting of pairs of mammary glands with protruding teats. In cattle and camels, there are normally two pairs, in sheep, goats and deer, there is one pair, and in some animals, there are many pairs. In animals with udders, the mammary glands develop on the milk line near the groin, and mammary glands that develop on the chest (such as in humans and apes and elephants) are generally referred to as breasts.

Udder care and hygiene in cows is important in milking, aiding uninterrupted and untainted milk production, and preventing mastitis. Products exist to soothe the chapped skin of the udder. This helps prevent bacterial infection, and reduces irritation during milking by the cups, and so the cow is less likely to kick the cups off. It has been demonstrated that incorporating nutritional supplements into diet, including vitamin E, is an additional method of improving udder health and reducing infection.

Etymology 
Udder has been attested in Middle English as udder or uddyr (also as uther, iddyr), and in Old English as ūder. It was evolved from the Proto-Germanic reconstructed root *eudrą or *ūdrą, which in turn descended from Proto-Indo-European *h₁ówHdʰr̥ (“udder”). It is cognate with Saterland Frisian Jadder (“udder”), Dutch uier (“udder”), German Euter (“udder”), Swedish juver (“udder”), Icelandic júgur (“udder”), Vedic Sanskrit ऊधर् (ū́dhar), Ancient Greek οὖθαρ (oûthar), and Latin ūber.

As food 
The udder, or elder in Ireland, Scotland and northern England, of a slaughtered cow was in times past prepared and consumed. In other countries, like Italy, cow udder is still consumed in dishes like the traditional teteun.

References

External links 
 

Mammal anatomy
Breast
Exocrine system
Mammal female reproductive system
Glands
Secondary sexual characteristics
Dairy farming